Kabumpo in Oz (1922) is the sixteenth Oz book, and the second written by Ruth Plumly Thompson. It was the first Oz book fully credited to her. (Her first, The Royal Book of Oz, was credited to L. Frank Baum on the cover.)

Plot summary

During Prince Pompadore of Pumperdink's eighteenth birthday celebration, his birthday cake explodes, revealing a magic scroll, a magic mirror, and a doorknob. The scroll warns the prince that if he doesn't wed a "proper princess" within seven days, his entire kingdom will disappear. The prince, along with the kingdom's wise elephant Kabumpo, set off on an adventure to the Emerald City so Pompa can marry Princess Ozma, the only "proper princess" the Elegant Elephant can think of as worthy of his prince.

Meanwhile, Ruggedo the Gnome King (Thompson "corrected" Baum's spelling of "Nome") finds Glegg's Box of Mixed Magic while tunnelling under the Emerald City. After he brings a wooden doll, Peg Amy, to life, and makes Wag the rabbit the size of a man, Ruggedo turns himself into a giant. This means that Ozma's palace gets stuck on his head, and in a panic he runs off to Ev with it.

After many adventures in the strange lands of Rith Metic, the Illumi Nation, and the Soup Sea, Pompadore and Kabumpo arrive in the Emerald City to find Ozma missing. They set off to find her and eventually meet up with Wag and Peg Amy. The group reaches the edge of the Deadly Desert and is hijacked by the Runaway Country, a conscious, talking, mobile piece of land. It carries them over the desert to Ev.

Eventually, Peg Amy is revealed to be the princess of Sun Top Mountain (she was turned into a tree by the evil magician J. Glegg when she refused to marry him, then Cap'n Bill took part of the tree and carved her into a wooden doll for Trot), regains her original human form, and Pompadore marries her.

References

External links
 
 The novel's text online
 On Kabumpo in Oz
 Review/discussion of Kabumpo in Oz at Tor.com

1922 American novels
1922 children's books
1922 fantasy novels
Oz (franchise) books
Books about elephants